Cachou may refer to:

 Throat lozenge, a breath freshener
 Dragée, small candies that can be used for decoration
 Catechu, a medicinal aromatic drug; the same as gambier, also called Terra Japonica